Ciuhur Ocnița was a Moldovan football club based in Ocnița, Moldova. It was founded in 1995 and has played one season in Moldovan National Division - 1996–97.

References

External links
 Ciuhur Ocniţa at WeltFussballArchive  

Defunct football clubs in Moldova
Association football clubs established in 1995
1995 establishments in Moldova
1997 disestablishments in Moldova